Heiderscheid is a small town in northwestern Luxembourg. It is part of the canton of Wiltz, which is part of the district of Diekirch.

Previously, it was a former commune but was merged into Esch-sur-Sûre (with Neunhausen) in 2011.

, the town of Heiderscheid had a population of 393.

Former commune
The former commune consisted of the villages:

 Dirbach
 Eschdorf (former seat)
 Heiderscheid
 Fond de Heiderscheid
 Merscheid
 Ringel
 Tadler
 Hierheck (lieu-dit)

References

Wiltz (canton)
Towns in Luxembourg